Lusser's law in systems engineering is a prediction of reliability. Named after engineer Robert Lusser, and also known as Lusser's product law or the probability product law of series components, it states that the reliability of a series of components is equal to the product of the individual reliabilities of the components, if their failure modes are known to be statistically independent. For a series of N components, this is expressed as:

where Rs is the overall reliability of the system, and rn is the reliability of the nth component.

If the failure probabilities of all components are equal, then as Lusser's colleague Erich Pieruschka observed, this can be expressed simply as:

Lusser's law has been described as the idea that a series system is  "weaker than its weakest link", as the product reliability of a series of components can be less than the lowest-value component.

For example, given a series system of two components with different reliabilities — one of 0.95 and the other of 0.8 — Lusser's law will predict a reliability of

which is lower than either of the individual components.

References

Engineering failures
Reliability analysis
Reliability engineering
Statistics articles needing expert attention
Survival analysis
Systems analysis